Eimert "Epi" Drost (21 September 1945 in Amersfoort – 27 May 1995 in Rotterdam) was an association football player and manager from the Netherlands, best known for his time with FC Twente.

Playing career

Club
He made his senior debut for FC Wageningen on 23 September 1962 against De Graafschap, then had a short spell with Heracles Almelo, before joining manager Kees Rijvers at FC Twente where he would become one of the best players in the history of the club. Known for his colourful lifestyle and fierce shot, he played 423 league games for the club, only to be surpassed by Sander Boschker in 2006. During his time at the club, Twente would finish 2nd (behind Feyenoord) in 1974 and 3rd in 1969 in the Eredivisie and would reach the 1975 UEFA Cup Final. His only trophy would be the 1977 KNVB Cup, he scored Twente's first goal in the final with a 30-yard piledriver.

He later played for DS '79, where he was joined by long-time Twente colleague Niels Overweg, before returning to Twente for a final season in which he was injured and could not save the club from relegation.

International
Drost made his debut for the Netherlands in an April 1969 friendly match against Switzerland and earned a total of 9 caps, scoring no goals. His final international was a September 1973 FIFA World Cup qualification match against Norway.

Managerial career
He coached RBC Roosendaal, DS '79 and Hoofdklasse club STEVO, with whom he won the Dutch Sunday-amateur football title in 1994.

Personal life
He was a son of former HVC and Wageningen player Selis Drost.

Death and legacy
Drost died in May 1995 of a heart attack during a game with Holland's former internationals players in Rotterdam. He was chosen Twente's player of the century by the club's supporters in 2000 and in 2009, a statue of Mister Twente Epi Drost was erected in FC Twente's stadium.

References

External links
 

1945 births
1995 deaths
Sportspeople from Amersfoort
Association football central defenders
Dutch footballers
Netherlands international footballers
FC Wageningen players
Heracles Almelo players
FC Twente players
FC Dordrecht players
Dutch football managers
RBC Roosendaal managers
FC Dordrecht managers
Association football players who died while playing
Sport deaths in the Netherlands
Footballers from Utrecht (province)